Annika Morgan (born 12 February 2002) is a German snowboarder who competes in the slopestyle and big air events. She competed in the women's slopestyle event at the 2022 Winter Olympics.

References

External links
 

2002 births
Living people
German female snowboarders
Snowboarders at the 2022 Winter Olympics
Olympic snowboarders of Germany
Sportspeople from Garmisch-Partenkirchen
Snowboarders at the 2020 Winter Youth Olympics
21st-century German women